Austrosticta fieldi is a species of damselfly in the family Isostictidae,
commonly known as a northern pondsitter. 
It has been recorded from Northern Territory, Australia, where it inhabits streams.

Austrosticta fieldi is a medium-sized damselfly, coloured a dull grey-brown with some pale markings.

Gallery

See also
 List of Odonata species of Australia

References 

Isostictidae
Odonata of Australia
Insects of Australia
Endemic fauna of Australia
Taxa named by Robert John Tillyard
Insects described in 1908
Damselflies